Mastichari or Mastihari is a fishing village and tourist resort on the island of Kos in Greece with a population of 470, situated 7 kilometers away from Kos International Airport. The town has a port with boats regularly departing to the island of Kalymnos. Mastihari has only been inhabited since 1933, when an earthquake struck a nearby village and the inhabitants had to migrate.

References

Villages in Greece